The relationship between biology and sexual orientation is a subject of research. While scientists do not know the exact cause of sexual orientation, they theorize that it is caused by a complex interplay of genetic, hormonal, and environmental influences. Hypotheses for the impact of the post-natal social environment on sexual orientation, however, are weak, especially for males.

Biological theories for explaining the causes of sexual orientation are favored by scientists. These factors, which may be related to the development of a sexual orientation, include genes, the early uterine environment (such as prenatal hormones), and brain structure.

Scientific research and studies

Fetal development and hormones 

The influence of hormones on the developing fetus has been the most influential causal hypothesis of the development of sexual orientation. In simple terms, the developing fetal brain begins in a "female" typical state. The presence of the Y-chromosome in males prompts the development of testes, which release testosterone, the primary androgen receptor-activating hormone, to masculinize the fetus and fetal brain. This masculinizing effect pushes males towards male typical brain structures, and most of the time, attraction to females. It has been hypothesized that gay men may have been exposed to low levels of testosterone in key regions of the brain compared to straight men, or had different levels of receptivity to its masculinizing effects, or experienced fluctuations at critical times. In women, it is hypothesized that high levels of exposure to testosterone in key regions may increase likelihood of same sex attraction. Supporting this are studies of the finger digit ratio of the right hand, which is a robust marker of prenatal testosterone exposure . Lesbians on average, have significantly more masculine digit ratios, a finding which has been replicated numerous times in studies cross-culturally. While direct effects are hard to measure for ethical reasons, animal experiments where scientists manipulate exposure to sex hormones during gestation can also induce lifelong male-typical behavior and mounting in female animals, and female-typical behavior in male animals.

Maternal immune responses during fetal development are strongly demonstrated as causing male homosexuality and bisexuality. Research since the 1990s has demonstrated that the more male sons a woman has, there is a higher chance of later born sons being gay. During pregnancy, male cells enter a mother's bloodstream, which are foreign to her immune system. In response, she develops antibodies to neutralize them. These antibodies are then released on future male foetuses and may neutralize Y-linked antigens, which play a role in brain masculinization, leaving areas of the brain responsible for sexual attraction in the female-typical position, or attracted to men. The more sons a mother has will increase the levels of these antibodies, thus creating the observed fraternal birth order effect. Biochemical evidence to support this effect was confirmed in a lab study in 2017, finding that mothers with a gay son, particularly those with older brothers, had heightened levels of antibodies to the NLGN4Y Y-protein than mothers with heterosexual sons. J. Michael Bailey has described maternal immune responses as "causal" of male homosexuality. This effect is estimated to account for between 15 and 29% of gay men, while other gay and bisexual men are thought to owe sexual orientation to genetic and hormonal interactions.

Socialization theories, which were dominant in the 1900s, favored the idea that children were born "undifferentiated" and were socialized into gender roles and sexual orientation. This led to medical experiments in which newborn and infant boys were surgically reassigned into girls after accidents such as botched circumcisions. These males were then reared and raised as females without telling the boys, which, contrary to expectations, did not make them feminine nor attracted to men. All published cases providing sexual orientation grew up to be strongly attracted to women. The failure of these experiments demonstrate that socialization effects does not induce feminine type behavior in males, nor make them attracted to men, and that the organizational effects of hormones on the fetal brain prior to birth have permanent effects. These are indicative of 'nature', not nurture, at least with regards to male sexual orientation.

The sexually dimorphic nucleus of the preoptic area (SDN-POA) is a key region of the brain which differs between males and females in humans and a number of mammals (e.g., sheep/rams, mice, rats), and is caused by sex differences in hormone exposure. The INAH-3 region is bigger in males than in females, and is thought to be a critical region in sexual behavior. Dissection studies found that gay men had significantly smaller sized INAH-3 than heterosexual males, which is shifted in the female typical direction, a finding first demonstrated by neuroscientist Simon LeVay, which has been replicated. Dissection studies are rare, however, due to lack of funding and brain samples.

Long-term studies of domesticated sheep led by Charles Roselli have found that 6-8% of rams have a homosexual preference through their life. Dissection of ram brains also found a similar smaller (feminized) structure in homosexually oriented rams compared to heterosexually oriented rams in the equivalent brain region to the human SDN, the ovine sexually dimorphic nucleus (oSDN). The size of the sheep oSDN has also been demonstrated to be formed in utero, rather than postnatally, underscoring the role of prenatal hormones in masculinization of the brain for sexual attraction.

Other studies in humans have relied on brain imaging technology, such as research led by Ivanka Savic which compared hemispheres of the brain. This research found that straight men had right hemispheres 2% larger than the left, described as modest but "highly significant difference" by LeVay. In heterosexual women, the two hemispheres were the same size. In gay men, the two hemispheres were also the same size, or sex atypical, while in lesbians, the right hemispheres were slightly larger than the left, indicating a small shift in the male direction.

A model proposed by evolutionary geneticist William R. Rice argues that a misexpressed epigenetic modifier of testosterone sensitivity or insensitivity that affected development of the brain can explain homosexuality, and can best explain twin discordance. Rice et al. propose that these epimarks normally canalize sexual development, preventing intersex conditions in most of the population, but sometimes failing to erase across generations and causing reversed sexual preference. On grounds of evolutionary plausibility, Gavrilets, Friberg and Rice argue that all mechanisms for exclusive homosexual orientations likely trace back to their epigenetic model. Testing this hypothesis is possible with current stem cell technology.

Prenatal thyroid theory 

Prenatal thyroid theory of same-sex attraction/gender dysphoria has been based on clinical and developmental observations of youngsters presenting to child psychiatry clinics in Istanbul/Turkey. The report of 12 cases with same-sex attraction/gender dysphoria born to mothers with thyroid diseases was first presented in EPA Congress, Vienna (2015) and published as an article in the same year. The extremely significant relationship between the two conditions suggested an independent model, named as Prenatal Thyroid Model of Homosexuality. According to Turkish child & adolescent psychiatrist Osman Sabuncuoglu, who generated the theory, maternal thyroid dysfunction may lead to abnormal deviations from gender-specific development in the offspring. Autoimmune destructive process as seen in Hashimoto thyroiditis, diminished supply of thyroid hormones and impacts on prenatal androgen system were all considered as contributing mechanisms. In a follow-up theoretical paper, previous research findings indicating higher rates of  polycystic ovary syndrome (PCOS) in female-to-male transsexuals and lesbian women were conceived as an indication of Prenatal Thyroid Model since PCOS and autoimmune thyroiditis are frequently comorbid diseases. Likewise, increased rates of autism spectrum disorder in children born to mothers with thyroid dysfunction and overrepresentation of ASD individuals in gender dysphoria populations suggest such an association. A second group of young children with this pattern were presented in IACAPAP Congress, Prague (2018).

The findings from previous research in LGBT populations had called for attention to be paid to thyroid system. A commentary by Jeffrey Mullen, published shortly after the 2015 article, underlined the importance of Prenatal Thyroid Model and supported developments in this field. Afterwards, several authors have emphasized the role of thyroid system in sexuality while citing the Prenatal Thyroid Model. Among them, Carosa et al. concluded that thyroid hormones, affecting the human sexual function strongly, the thyroid gland must be considered, along with the genitals and the brain, a sexual organ. As a tertiary source, an authoritative book on the subject of interplay between endocrinology, brain and behavior has also cited the thyroid-homosexuality proposal article in the latest edition. Most importantly, a genome-wide genetic association study on male homosexuals identified a significant region on Chromosome 14 which is related to autoimmune thyroid dysfunction in human beings. This is apparently a big support to the Prenatal Thyroid Model.

Genetic influences 
Multiple genes have been found to play a role in sexual orientation. Scientists caution that many people misconstrue the meanings of genetic and environmental. Environmental influence does not automatically imply that the social environment influences or contributes to the development of sexual orientation. Hypotheses for the impact of the post-natal social environment on sexual orientation are weak, especially for males. There is, however, a vast non-social environment that is non-genetic yet still biological, such as prenatal development, that likely helps shape sexual orientation.

Twin studies

A number of twin studies have attempted to compare the relative importance of genetics and environment in the determination of sexual orientation. In a 1991 study, Bailey and Pillard conducted a study of male twins recruited from "homophile publications", and found that 52% of monozygotic (MZ) brothers (of whom 59 were questioned) and 22% of the dizygotic (DZ) twins were concordant for homosexuality. 'MZ' indicates identical twins with the same sets of genes and 'DZ' indicates fraternal twins where genes are mixed to an extent similar to that of non-twin siblings. In a study of 61 pairs of twins, researchers found among their mostly male subjects a concordance rate for homosexuality of 66% among monozygotic twins and a 30% one among dizygotic twins. In 2000, Bailey, Dunne and Martin studied a larger sample of 4,901 Australian twins but reported less than half the level of concordance. They found 20% concordance in the male identical or MZ twins and 24% concordance for the female identical or MZ twins. Self reported zygosity, sexual attraction, fantasy and behaviours were assessed by questionnaire and zygosity was serologically checked when in doubt. Other researchers support biological causes for both men and women's sexual orientation.

A 2008 study of all adult twins in Sweden (more than 7,600 twins) found that same-sex behaviour was explained by both heritable genetic factors and unique environmental factors (which can include the prenatal environment during gestation, exposure to illness in early life, peer groups not shared with a twin, etc.), although a twin study cannot identify which factor is at play. Influences of the shared environment (influences including the family environment, rearing, shared peer groups, culture and societal views, and sharing the same school and community) had no effect for men, and a weak effect for women. This is consistent with the common finding that parenting and culture appears to play no role in male sexual orientation, but may play some small role in women. The study concludes that genetic influences on any lifetime same-sex partner were stronger for men than women, and that "it has been suggested individual differences in heterosexual and homosexual behavior result from unique environmental factors such as prenatal exposure to sex hormones, progressive maternal immunization to sex-specific proteins, or neurodevelopmental factors", although does not rule out other variables. The use of all adult twins in Sweden was designed to address the criticism of volunteer studies, in which a potential bias towards participation by gay twins may influence the results:

Chromosome linkage studies

Chromosome linkage studies of sexual orientation have indicated the presence of multiple contributing genetic factors throughout the genome. In 1993, Dean Hamer and colleagues published findings from a linkage analysis of a sample of 76 gay brothers and their families. Hamer et al. found that the gay men had more gay male uncles and cousins on the maternal side of the family than on the paternal side. Gay brothers who showed this maternal pedigree were then tested for X chromosome linkage, using twenty-two markers on the X chromosome to test for similar alleles. In another finding, thirty-three of the forty sibling pairs tested were found to have similar alleles in the distal region of Xq28, which was significantly higher than the expected rates of 50% for fraternal brothers. This was popularly dubbed the "gay gene" in the media, causing significant controversy. In 1998, Sanders et al. reported on their similar study, in which they found that 13% of uncles of gay brothers on the maternal side were homosexual, compared with 6% on the paternal side.

A later analysis by Hu et al. replicated and refined the earlier findings. This study revealed that 67% of gay brothers in a new saturated sample shared a marker on the X chromosome at Xq28. Two other studies (Bailey et al., 1999; McKnight and Malcolm, 2000) failed to find a preponderance of gay relatives in the maternal line of homosexual men. One study by Rice et al. in 1999 failed to replicate the Xq28 linkage results. Meta-analysis of all available linkage data indicates a significant link to Xq28, but also indicates that additional genes must be present to account for the full heritability of sexual orientation.

Mustanski et al. (2005) performed a full-genome scan (instead of just an X chromosome scan) on individuals and families previously reported on in Hamer et al. (1993) and Hu et al. (1995), as well as additional new subjects. In the full sample they did not find linkage to Xq28.

Results from the first large, comprehensive multi-center genetic linkage study of male sexual orientation were reported by an independent group of researchers at the American Society of Human Genetics in 2012. The study population included 409 independent pairs of gay brothers, who were analyzed with over 300,000 single-nucleotide polymorphism markers. The data strongly replicated Hamer's Xq28 findings as determined by both two-point and multipoint (MERLIN) LOD score mapping. Significant linkage was also detected in the pericentromeric region of chromosome 8, overlapping with one of the regions detected in the Hamer lab's previous genomewide study. The authors concluded that "our findings, taken in context with previous work, suggest that genetic variation in each of these regions contributes to development of the important psychological trait of male sexual orientation". Female sexual orientation does not seem to be linked to Xq28, though it does appear moderately heritable.

In addition to sex chromosomal contribution, a potential autosomal genetic contribution to the development of homosexual orientation has also been suggested. In a study population composed of more than 7000 participants, Ellis et al. (2008) found a statistically significant difference in the frequency of blood type A between homosexuals and heterosexuals. They also found that "unusually high" proportions of homosexual males and homosexual females were Rh negative in comparison to heterosexuals. As both blood type and Rh factor are genetically inherited traits controlled by alleles located on chromosome 9 and chromosome 1 respectively, the study indicates a potential link between genes on autosomes and homosexuality.

The biology of sexual orientation has been studied in detail in several animal model systems. In the common fruit fly Drosophila melanogaster, the complete pathway of sexual differentiation of the brain and the behaviors it controls is well established in both males and females, providing a concise model of biologically controlled courtship. In mammals, a group of geneticists at the Korea Advanced Institute of Science and Technology bred a female mice specifically lacking a particular gene related to sexual behavior. Without the gene, the mice exhibited masculine sexual behavior and attraction toward urine of other female mice. Those mice who retained the gene fucose mutarotase (FucM) were attracted to male mice.

In interviews to the press, researchers have pointed that the evidence of genetic influences should not be equated with genetic determinism. According to Dean Hamer and Michael Bailey, genetic aspects are only one of the multiple causes of homosexuality.

In 2017, Scientific Reports published an article with a genome wide association study on male sexual orientation. The research consisted of 1,077 homosexual men and 1,231 heterosexual men. A gene named SLITRK6 on chromosome 13 was identified. The research supports another study which had been done by the neuroscientist Simon LeVay. LeVay's research suggested that the hypothalamus of gay men is different from straight men. The SLITRK6 is active in the mid-brain where the hypothalamus is. The researchers found that the thyroid stimulating hormone receptor (TSHR) on chromosome 14 shows sequence differences between gay and straight men. Graves' disease is associated with TSHR abnormalities, with previous research indicating that Graves' disease is more common in gay men than in straight men. Research indicated that gay people have lower body weight than straight people. It had been suggested that the overactive TSHR hormone lowered body weight in gay people, though this remains unproven.

In 2018, Ganna et al. performed another genome-wide association study on sexual orientation of men and women with data from 26,890 people who had at least one same-sex partner and 450,939 controls. The data in the study was meta-analyzed and obtained from the UK Biobank study and 23andMe. The researchers identified four variants more common in people who reported at least one same-sex experience on chromosomes 7, 11, 12, and 15. The variants on chromosomes 11 and 15 were specific to men, with the variant on chromosome 11 located in an olfactory gene and the variant on chromosome 15 having previously been linked to male-pattern baldness. The four variants were also correlated with mood and mental health disorders; major depressive disorder and schizophrenia in men and women, and bipolar disorder in women. However, none of the four variants could reliably predict sexual orientation.

In August 2019, a genome-wide association study of 493,001 individuals concluded that hundreds or thousands of genetic variants underlie homosexual behavior in both sexes, with 5 variants in particular being significantly associated. Some of these variants had sex-specific effects, and two of these variants suggested links to biological pathways that involve sex hormone regulation and olfaction. All the variants together captured between 8 and 25% of the variation in individual differences in homosexual behavior. These genes partly overlap with those for several other traits, including openness to experience and risk-taking behavior. Additional analyses suggested that sexual behavior, attraction, identity, and fantasies are influenced by a similar set of genetic variants. They also found that the genetic effects that differentiate heterosexual from homosexual behavior are not the same as those that differ among nonheterosexuals with lower versus higher proportions of same-sex partners, which suggests that there is no single continuum from heterosexual to homosexual preference, as suggested by the Kinsey scale.

In October 2021, another research paper reported that genetic factors influence the development of same-sex sexual behavior. A two-stage genome-wide association study (GWAS) with a total sample of 1478 homosexual males and 3313 heterosexual males in Han Chinese populations identified two genetic loci (FMR1NB and ZNF536) showing consistent association with male sexual orientation.

Epigenetics studies

A study suggests linkage between a mother's genetic make-up and homosexuality of her sons. Women have two X chromosomes, one of which is "switched off". The inactivation of the X chromosome occurs randomly throughout the embryo, resulting in cells that are mosaic with respect to which chromosome is active. In some cases though, it appears that this switching off can occur in a non-random fashion. Bocklandt et al. (2006) reported that, in mothers of homosexual men, the number of women with extreme skewing of X chromosome inactivation is significantly higher than in mothers without gay sons. 13% of mothers with one gay son, and 23% of mothers with two gay sons, showed extreme skewing, compared to 4% of mothers without gay sons.

Birth order

Blanchard and Klassen (1997) reported that each additional older brother increases the odds of a man being gay by 33%. This is now "one of the most reliable epidemiological variables ever identified in the study of sexual orientation". To explain this finding, it has been proposed that male fetuses provoke a maternal immune reaction that becomes stronger with each successive male fetus. This maternal immunization hypothesis (MIH) begins when cells from a male fetus enter the mother's circulation during pregnancy or while giving birth. Male fetuses produce H-Y antigens which are "almost certainly involved in the sexual differentiation of vertebrates". These Y-linked proteins would not be recognized in the mother's immune system because she is female, causing her to develop antibodies which would travel through the placental barrier into the fetal compartment. From here, the anti-male bodies would then cross the blood/brain barrier (BBB) of the developing fetal brain, altering sex-dimorphic brain structures relative to sexual orientation, increasing the likelihood that the exposed son will be more attracted to men than women. It is this antigen which maternal H-Y antibodies are proposed to both react to and 'remember'. Successive male fetuses are then attacked by H-Y antibodies which somehow decrease the ability of H-Y antigens to perform their usual function in brain masculinization.

In 2017, researchers discovered a biological mechanism of gay people who tend to have older brothers. They think Neuroligin 4 Y-linked protein is responsible for a later son being gay. They found that women had significantly higher anti-NLGN4Y levels than men. In addition, mothers of gay sons, particularly those with older brothers, had significantly higher anti-NLGN4Y levels than did the control samples of women, including mothers of heterosexual sons. The results suggest an association between a maternal immune response to NLGN4Y and subsequent sexual orientation in male offspring.

The fraternal birth order effect, however, does not apply to instances where a firstborn is homosexual.

Female fertility
In 2004, Italian researchers conducted a study of about 4,600 people who were the relatives of 98 homosexual and 100 heterosexual men. Female relatives of the homosexual men tended to have more offspring than those of the heterosexual men. Female relatives of the homosexual men on their mother's side tended to have more offspring than those on the father's side. The researchers concluded that there was genetic material being passed down on the X chromosome which both promotes fertility in the mother and homosexuality in her male offspring. The connections discovered would explain about 20% of the cases studied, indicating that this is a highly significant but not the sole genetic factor determining sexual orientation.

Pheromone studies
Research conducted in Sweden has suggested that gay and straight men respond differently to two odors that are believed to be involved in sexual arousal. The research showed that when both heterosexual women and gay men are exposed to a testosterone derivative found in men's sweat, a region in the hypothalamus is activated. Heterosexual men, on the other hand, have a similar response to an estrogen-like compound found in women's urine. The conclusion is that sexual attraction, whether same-sex or opposite-sex oriented, operates similarly on a biological level. Researchers have suggested that this possibility could be further explored by studying young subjects to see if similar responses in the hypothalamus are found and then correlating these data with adult sexual orientation.

Studies of brain structure
A number of sections of the brain have been reported to be sexually dimorphic; that is, they vary between men and women. There have also been reports of variations in brain structure corresponding to sexual orientation. In 1990, Dick Swaab and Michel A. Hofman reported a difference in the size of the suprachiasmatic nucleus between homosexual and heterosexual men. In 1992, Allen and Gorski reported a difference related to sexual orientation in the size of the anterior commissure, but this research was refuted by numerous studies, one of which found that the entirety of the variation was caused by a single outlier.

Research on the physiologic differences between male and female brains are based on the idea that people have male or a female brain, and this mirrors the behavioral differences between the two sexes. Some researchers state that solid scientific support for this is lacking. Although consistent differences have been identified, including the size of the brain and of specific brain regions, male and female brains are very similar.

Sexually dimorphic nuclei in the anterior hypothalamus
LeVay also conducted some of these early researches. He studied four groups of neurons in the hypothalamus called INAH1, INAH2, INAH3 and INAH4. This was a relevant area of the brain to study, because of evidence that it played a role in the regulation of sexual behaviour in animals, and because INAH2 and INAH3 had previously been reported to differ in size between men and women.

He obtained brains from 41 deceased hospital patients. The subjects were classified into three groups. The first group comprised 19 gay men who had died of AIDS-related illnesses. The second group comprised 16 men whose sexual orientation was unknown, but whom the researchers presumed to be heterosexual. Six of these men had died of AIDS-related illnesses. The third group was of six women whom the researchers presumed to be heterosexual. One of the women had died of an AIDS-related illness.

The HIV-positive people in the presumably heterosexual patient groups were all identified from medical records as either intravenous drug abusers or recipients of blood transfusions. Two of the men who identified as heterosexual specifically denied ever engaging in a homosexual sex act. The records of the remaining heterosexual subjects contained no information about their sexual orientation; they were assumed to have been primarily or exclusively heterosexual "on the basis of the numerical preponderance of heterosexual men in the population".

LeVay found no evidence for a difference between the groups in the size of INAH1, INAH2 or INAH4. However, the INAH3 group appeared to be twice as big in the heterosexual male group as in the gay male group; the difference was highly significant, and remained significant when only the six AIDS patients were included in the heterosexual group. The size of INAH3 in the homosexual men's brains was comparable to the size of INAH3 in the heterosexual women's brains.

William Byne and colleagues attempted to identify the size differences reported in INAH 1–4 by replicating the experiment using brain sample from other subjects: 14 HIV-positive homosexual males, 34 presumed heterosexual males (10 HIV-positive), and 34 presumed heterosexual females (9 HIV-positive). The researchers found a significant difference in INAH3 size between heterosexual men and heterosexual women. The INAH3 size of the homosexual men was apparently smaller than that of the heterosexual men, and larger than that of the heterosexual women, though neither difference quite reached statistical significance.

Byne and colleagues also weighed and counted numbers of neurons in INAH3 tests not carried out by LeVay. The results for INAH3 weight were similar to those for INAH3 size; that is, the INAH3 weight for the heterosexual male brains was significantly larger than for the heterosexual female brains, while the results for the gay male group were between those of the other two groups but not quite significantly different from either. The neuron count also found a male-female difference in INAH3, but found no trend related to sexual orientation.

LeVay has said that Byne replicated his work, but that he employed a two-tailed statistical analysis, which is typically reserved for when no previous findings had employed the difference. LeVay has said that "given that my study had already reported a INAH3 to be smaller in gay men, a one tailed approach would have been more appropriate, and it would have yielded a significant difference [between heterosexual and homosexual men]".

J. Michael Bailey has criticized LeVay's critics—describing the claim that the INAH-3 difference could be attributable to AIDS as "aggravating", since the "INAH-3 did not differ between the brains of straight men who died of AIDS and those who did not have the disease". Bailey has further criticized the second objection that was raised, that being gay might have somehow caused the difference in INAH-3, and not vice-versa, saying "the problem with this idea is that the hypothalamus appears to develop early. Not a single expert I have ever asked about LeVay's study thought it was plausible that sexual behavior caused the INAH-3 differences."

The SCN of homosexual males has been demonstrated to be larger (both the volume and the number of neurons are twice as many as in heterosexual males). These areas of the hypothalamus have not yet been explored in homosexual females nor bisexual males nor females. Although the functional implications of such findings still have not been examined in detail, they cast serious doubt over the widely accepted Dörner hypothesis that homosexual males have a "female hypothalamus" and that the key mechanism of differentiating the "male brain from originally female brain" is the epigenetic influence of testosterone during prenatal development.

A 2010 study by Garcia-Falgueras and Swaab stated that "the fetal brain develops during the intrauterine period in the male direction through a direct action of testosterone on the developing nerve cells, or in the female direction through the absence of this hormone surge. In this way, our gender identity (the conviction of belonging to the male or female gender) and sexual orientation are programmed or organized into our brain structures when we are still in the womb. There is no indication that social environment after birth has an effect on gender identity or sexual orientation."

Ovine model
The domestic ram is used as an experimental model to study early programming of the neural mechanisms which underlie homosexuality, developing from the observation that approximately 8% of domestic rams are sexually attracted to other rams (male-oriented) when compared to the majority of rams which are female-oriented. In many species, a prominent feature of sexual differentiation is the presence of a sexually dimorphic nucleus (SDN) in the preoptic hypothalamus, which is larger in males than in females.

Roselli et al. discovered an ovine SDN (oSDN) in the preoptic hypothalamus that is smaller in male-oriented rams than in female-oriented rams, but similar in size to the oSDN of females. Neurons of the oSDN show aromatase expression which is also smaller in male-oriented rams versus female-oriented rams, suggesting that sexual orientation is neurologically hard-wired and may be influenced by hormones. However, results failed to associate the role of neural aromatase in the sexual differentiation of brain and behavior in the sheep, due to the lack of defeminization of adult sexual partner preference or oSDN volume as a result of aromatase activity in the brain of the fetuses during the critical period. Having said this, it is more likely that oSDN morphology and homosexuality may be programmed through an androgen receptor that does not involve aromatisation. Most of the data suggests that homosexual rams, like female-oriented rams, are masculinized and defeminized with respect to mounting, receptivity, and gonadotrophin secretion, but are not defeminized for sexual partner preferences, also suggesting that such behaviors may be programmed differently. Although the exact function of the oSDN is not fully known, its volume, length, and cell number seem to correlate with sexual orientation, and a dimorphism in its volume and of cells could bias the processing cues involved in partner selection. More research is needed in order to understand the requirements and timing of the development of the oSDN and how prenatal programming effects the expression of mate choice in adulthood.

Childhood gender nonconformity 
Childhood gender nonconformity is a strong predictor of adult sexual orientation that has been consistently replicated in research, and is thought to be strong evidence of a biological difference between heterosexual and non-heterosexuals. A review authored by J. Michael Bailey states: "childhood gender nonconformity comprises the following phenomena among boys: cross-dressing, desiring to have long hair, playing with dolls, disliking competitive sports and rough play, preferring girls as playmates, exhibiting elevated separation anxiety, and desiring to be—or believing that one is—a girl. In girls, gender nonconformity comprises dressing like and playing with boys, showing interest in competitive sports and rough play, lacking interest in conventionally female toys such as dolls and makeup, and desiring to be a boy". This gender nonconformist behavior typically emerges at preschool age, although is often evident as early as age 2. Children are only considered gender nonconforming if they persistently engage in a variety of these behaviors, as opposed to engaging in a behavior on a few times or on occasion. It is also not a one-dimensional trait, but rather has varying degrees.

Children who grow up to be non-heterosexual were, on average, substantially more gender nonconforming in childhood. This is confirmed in both retrospective studies where homosexuals, bisexuals and heterosexuals are asked about their gender typical behavior in childhood, and in prospective studies, where highly gender nonconforming children are followed from childhood into adulthood to find out their sexual orientation. A review of retrospective studies that measured gender nonconforming traits estimated that 89% of homosexual men exceeded heterosexual males level of gender nonconformity, whereas just 2% of heterosexual men exceeded the homosexual median. For female sexual orientation, the figures were 81% and 12% respectively. A variety of other assessments such as childhood home videos, photos and reports of parents also confirm this finding. Critics of this research see this as confirming stereotypes; however, no study has ever demonstrated that this research has exaggerated childhood gender nonconformity. J. Michael Bailey argues that gay men often deny that they were gender nonconforming in childhood because they may have been bullied or maltreated by peers and parents for it, and because they often do not find femininity attractive in other gay males and thus would not want to acknowledge it in themselves. Additional research in Western cultures and non-Western cultures including Latin America, Asia, Polynesia, and the Middle East supports the validity of childhood gender nonconformity as a predictor of adult non-heterosexuality.

This research does not mean that all non-heterosexuals were gender nonconforming, but rather indicates that long before sexual attraction is known, non-heterosexuals, on average, are noticeably different from other children. There is little evidence that gender nonconforming children have been encouraged or taught to behave that way; rather, childhood gender nonconformity typically emerges despite conventional socialization. Medical experiments in which infant boys were sex reassigned and reared as girls did not make them feminine nor attracted to males.

Boys who were surgically reassigned female 
Between the 1960s and 2000, many newborn and infant boys were surgically reassigned as females if they were born with malformed penises, or if they lost their penises in accidents. Many surgeons believed such males would be happier being socially and surgically reassigned female. In all seven published cases that have provided sexual orientation information, the subjects grew up to be attracted to females. Six cases were exclusively attracted to females, with one case 'predominantly' attracted to females. In a review article in the journal Psychological Science in the Public Interest, six researchers including J. Michael Bailey state this establishes a strong case that male sexual orientation is partly established before birth:

They further argue that this raises questions about the significance of the social environment on sexual orientation, stating, "If one cannot reliably make a male human become attracted to other males by cutting off his penis in infancy and rearing him as a girl, then what other psychosocial intervention could plausibly have that effect?" It is further stated that neither cloacal exstrophy (resulting in a malformed penis), nor surgical accidents, are associated with abnormalities of prenatal androgens, thus, the brains of these individuals were male-organized at birth. Six of the seven identified as heterosexual males at follow up, despite being surgically altered and reared as females, with researchers adding: "available evidence indicates that in such instances, parents are deeply committed to raising these children as girls and in as gender-typical a manner as possible." Bailey et al. describe these sex reassignments as 'the near-perfect quasi-experiment' in measuring the impact of 'nature' versus 'nurture' with regards to male homosexuality.

'Exotic becomes erotic' theory
Daryl Bem, a social psychologist at Cornell University, has theorized that the influence of biological factors on sexual orientation may be mediated by experiences in childhood. A child's temperament predisposes the child to prefer certain activities over others. Because of their temperament, which is influenced by biological variables such as genetic factors, some children will be attracted to activities that are commonly enjoyed by other children of the same gender. Others will prefer activities that are typical of another gender. This will make a gender-conforming child feel different from opposite-gender children, while gender-nonconforming children will feel different from children of their own gender. According to Bem, this feeling of difference will evoke psychological arousal when the child is near members of the gender which it considers as being 'different'. Bem theorizes that this psychological arousal will later be transformed into sexual arousal: children will become sexually attracted to the gender which they see as different ("exotic"). This proposal is known as the "exotic becomes erotic" theory. Wetherell et al. state that Bem "does not intend his model as an absolute prescription for all individuals, but rather as a modal or average explanation."

Two critiques of Bem's theory in the journal Psychological Review concluded that "studies cited by Bem and additional research show that [the] Exotic Becomes Erotic theory is not supported by scientific evidence." Bem was criticized for relying on a non-random sample of gay men from the 1970s (rather than collecting new data) and for drawing conclusions that appear to contradict the original data. An "examination of the original data showed virtually all respondents were familiar with children of both sexes", and that only 9% of gay men said that "none or only a few" of their friends were male, and most gay men (74%) reported having "an especially close friend of the same sex" during grade school. Further, "71% of gay men reported feeling different from other boys, but so did 38% of heterosexual men. The difference for gay men is larger, but still indicates that feeling different from same-sex peers was common for heterosexual men." Bem also acknowledged that gay men were more likely to have older brothers (the fraternal birth order effect), which appeared to contradict an unfamiliarity with males. Bem cited cross-cultural studies which also "appear to contradict the EBE theory assertion", such as the Sambia tribe in Papua New Guinea, which ritually enforced homosexual acts among teenagers; yet once these boys reached adulthood, only a small proportion of men continued to engage in homosexual behaviour - similar to levels observed in the United States. Additionally, Bem's model could be interpreted as implying that if one could change a child's behavior, one could change their sexual orientation, but most psychologists doubt this would be possible.

Neuroscientist Simon LeVay said that while Bem's theory was arranged in a "believable temporal order", that it ultimately "lacks empirical support". Social psychologist Justin Lehmiller stated that Bem's theory has received praise "for the way it seamlessly links biological and environmental influences" and that there "is also some support for the model in the sense that childhood gender nonconformity is indeed one of the strongest predictors of adult homosexuality", but that the validity of the model "has been questioned on numerous grounds and scientists have largely rejected it."

Sexual orientation and evolution

General
Sexual practices that significantly reduce the frequency of heterosexual intercourse also significantly decrease the chances of successful reproduction, and for this reason, they would appear to be maladaptive in an evolutionary context following a simple Darwinian model (competition amongst individuals) of natural selection—on the assumption that homosexuality would reduce this frequency. Several theories have been advanced to explain this contradiction, and new experimental evidence has demonstrated their feasibility.

Some scholars have suggested that homosexuality is indirectly adaptive, by conferring a reproductive advantage in a non-obvious way on heterosexual siblings or their children, a hypothesised instance of kin selection. By way of analogy, the allele (a particular version of a gene) which causes sickle-cell anemia when two copies are present, also confers resistance to malaria with a lesser form of anemia when one copy is present (this is called heterozygous advantage).

Brendan Zietsch of the Queensland Institute of Medical Research proposes the alternative theory that men exhibiting female traits become more attractive to females and are thus more likely to mate, provided the genes involved do not drive them to complete rejection of heterosexuality.

In a 2008 study, its authors stated that "There is considerable evidence that human sexual orientation is genetically influenced, so it is not known how homosexuality, which tends to lower reproductive success, is maintained in the population at a relatively high frequency." They hypothesized that "while genes predisposing to homosexuality reduce homosexuals' reproductive success, they may confer some advantage in heterosexuals who carry them". Their results suggested that "genes predisposing to homosexuality may confer a mating advantage in heterosexuals, which could help explain the evolution and maintenance of homosexuality in the population". However, in the same study, the authors noted that "nongenetic alternative explanations cannot be ruled out" as a reason for the heterosexual in the homosexual-heterosexual twin pair having more partners, specifically citing "social pressure on the other twin to act in a more heterosexual way" (and thus seek out a greater number of sexual partners) as an example of one alternative explanation. The study acknowledges that a large number of sexual partners may not lead to greater reproductive success, specifically noting there is an "absence of evidence relating the number of sexual partners and actual reproductive success, either in the present or in our evolutionary past".

The heterosexual advantage hypothesis was given strong support by the 2004 Italian study demonstrating increased fecundity in the female matrilineal relatives of gay men. As originally pointed out by Hamer, even a modest increase in reproductive capacity in females carrying a "gay gene" could easily account for its maintenance at high levels in the population.

Gay uncle hypothesis
The "gay uncle hypothesis" posits that people who themselves do not have children may nonetheless increase the prevalence of their family's genes in future generations by providing resources (e.g., food, supervision, defense, shelter) to the offspring of their closest relatives.

This hypothesis is an extension of the theory of kin selection, which was originally developed to explain apparent altruistic acts which seemed to be maladaptive. The initial concept was suggested by J. B. S. Haldane in 1932 and later elaborated by many others including John Maynard Smith, W. D. Hamilton and Mary Jane West-Eberhard. This concept was also used to explain the patterns of certain social insects where most of the members are non-reproductive.

Vasey and VanderLaan (2010) tested the theory on the Pacific island of Samoa, where they studied women, straight men, and the fa'afafine, men who prefer other men as sexual partners and are accepted within the culture as a distinct third gender category. Vasey and VanderLaan found that the fa'afafine said they were significantly more willing to help kin, yet much less interested in helping children who are not family, providing the first evidence to support the kin selection hypothesis.

The hypothesis is consistent with other studies on homosexuality, which show that it is more prevalent amongst both siblings and twins.

Vasey and VanderLaan (2011) provides evidence that if an adaptively designed avuncular male androphilic phenotype exists and its development is contingent on a particular social environment, then a collectivistic cultural context is insufficient, in and of itself, for the expression of such a phenotype.

Biological differences in gay men and lesbian women

Some studies have found correlations between physiology of people and their sexuality; these studies provide evidence which suggests that:

 Gay men and straight women have, on average, equally proportioned brain hemispheres. Lesbian women and straight men have, on average, slightly larger right brain hemispheres.
 The suprachiasmatic nucleus of the hypothalamus was found by Swaab and Hopffman to be larger in gay men than in non-gay men; the suprachiasmatic nucleus is also known to be larger in men than in women.
 Gay men report, on average, slightly longer and thicker penises than non-gay men.
 The average size of the INAH 3 in the brains of gay men is approximately the same size as INAH 3 in women, which is significantly smaller, and the cells more densely packed, than in heterosexual men's brains.
 The anterior commissure was found to be larger in gay men than women and heterosexual men, but a subsequent study found no such difference.
 The functioning of the inner ear and the central auditory system in lesbians and bisexual women are more like the functional properties found in men than in non-gay women (the researchers argued this finding was consistent with the prenatal hormonal theory of sexual orientation).
 The startle response (eyeblink following a loud sound) is similarly masculinized in lesbians and bisexual women.
 Gay and non-gay people's brains respond differently to two putative sex pheromones (AND, found in male armpit secretions, and EST, found in female urine).
 The amygdala, a region of the brain, is more active in gay men than non-gay men when exposed to sexually arousing material.
 Finger length ratios between the index and ring fingers have been reported to differ, on average, between non-gay and lesbian women.
 Gay men and lesbians are significantly more likely to be left-handed or ambidextrous than non-gay men and women; Simon LeVay argues that because "[h]and preference is observable before birth... [t]he observation of increased non-right-handness in gay people is therefore consistent with the idea that sexual orientation is influenced by prenatal processes," perhaps heredity.
 A study of over 50 gay men found that about 23% had counterclockwise hair whorl, as opposed to 8% in the general population. This may correlate with left-handedness.
 Gay men have increased ridge density in the fingerprints on their left thumbs and little fingers.
 Length of limbs and hands of gay men is smaller compared to height than the general population, but only among white men.
J. Michael Bailey has argued that the early childhood gender nonconforming behavior of homosexuals, as opposed to biological markers, are better evidence of homosexuality being an inborn trait. He argues that gay men are "punished much more than rewarded" for their childhood gender nonconformity, and that such behavior "emerges with no encouragement, and despite opposition", making it "the sine qua non of innateness".

Political aspects

Whether genetic or other physiological determinants form the basis of sexual orientation is a highly politicized issue. The Advocate, a U.S. gay and lesbian newsmagazine, reported in 1996 that 61% of its readers believed that "it would mostly help gay and lesbian rights if homosexuality were found to be biologically determined". A cross-national study in the United States, the Philippines, and Sweden found that those who believed that "homosexuals are born that way" held significantly more positive attitudes toward homosexuality than those who believed that "homosexuals choose to be that way" or "learn to be that way".

Equal protection analysis in U.S. law determines when government requirements create a “suspect classification" of groups and therefore eligible for heightened scrutiny based on several factors, one of which is immutability.

Evidence that sexual orientation is biologically determined (and therefore perhaps immutable in the legal sense) would strengthen the legal case for heightened scrutiny of laws discriminating on that basis.

The perceived causes of sexual orientation have a significant bearing on the status of sexual minorities in the eyes of social conservatives. The Family Research Council, a conservative Christian think tank in Washington, D.C., argues in the book Getting It Straight that finding people are born gay "would advance the idea that sexual orientation is an innate characteristic, like race; that homosexuals, like African-Americans, should be legally protected against 'discrimination;' and that disapproval of homosexuality should be as socially stigmatized as racism. However, it is not true." On the other hand, some social conservatives such as Reverend Robert Schenck have argued that people can accept any scientific evidence while still morally opposing homosexuality. National Organization for Marriage board member and fiction writer Orson Scott Card has supported biological research on homosexuality, writing that "our scientific efforts in regard to homosexuality should be to identify genetic and uterine causes... so that the incidence of this dysfunction can be minimized.... [However, this should not be seen] as an attack on homosexuals, a desire to 'commit genocide' against the homosexual community... There is no 'cure' for homosexuality because it is not a disease. There are, however, different ways of living with homosexual desires."

Some advocates for the rights of sexual minorities resist what they perceive as attempts to pathologise or medicalise 'deviant' sexuality, and choose to fight for acceptance in a moral or social realm. The journalist Chandler Burr has stated that "[s]ome, recalling earlier psychiatric "treatments" for homosexuality, discern in the biological quest the seeds of genocide. They conjure up the specter of the surgical or chemical "rewiring" of gay people, or of abortions of fetal homosexuals who have been hunted down in the womb." LeVay has said in response to letters from gays and lesbians making such criticisms that the research "has contributed to the status of gay people in society".

See also 
 Against Nature?
 Environment and sexual orientation
 Epigenetic theories of homosexuality
 Gay bomb
 Homosexual behavior in animals
 Neuroscience and sexual orientation
 Norms of reaction
 Causes of gender incongruence

References

Further reading 

 
 
 
 
 
 
 
 
  
 

Sexual orientation and science
Behavioural genetics
Evolutionary psychology